Janet Nichols Lynch (née Janet Louise Nichols; born October 3, 1952) is an American author of young adult fiction, fiction, and nonfiction. Lynch is also a pianist and an educator in music, English, and history.

Early life and education 
Lynch was born in Sacramento, California, and raised in the nearby suburb of Carmichael. Her father, William R. Nichols, was a refrigeration engineer and her mother, Lena D. Graifemberg Nichols, was a homemaker. She has an older sister, Joyce, born in 1950. In 1974, Lynch graduated with a B.A. in music from California State University, Sacramento. She continued her musical study to earn a Master of Music in Piano Performance and Pedagogy from Arizona State University in 1976. In 2002, she earned an M.F.A. in creative writing from California State University, Fresno, where she studied fiction writing with Steve Yarbrough and David Borofka and creative nonfiction with John Hales.

Writing career 
Lynch's first published works were in cycling journalism and appeared in Competitive Cycling, Bike World, Bicycling, Women Sports, and similar publications, 1977–1980.

After turning to fiction writing, Lynch's first published short story appeared in The New Yorker in 1984. Her fiction also has been published in Seventeen, The San Joaquin Review, The Baltimore Review, Confrontation, Writers' Forum, Highway 99: a Literary Journey through California’s Great Central Valley, Tribute to Orpheus 2, and elsewhere. For the past sixteen years, she has read her short fiction on Valley Public Radio's Valley Writers Read (KVPR, Fresno, and KVPX, Bakersfield, FM 89.3), hosted by Franz Weinschenk.

Lynch is most known for her young adult novels, which are written in the genres of historical and realistic fiction and often set in California.

Awards
Lynch's young adult novel Messed Up, about a Mexican-American teen secretly living on his own in a small town of California's San Joaquin Valley, was awarded a 2009 ALA Quick Pick for Reluctant Readers and a VOYA Top of the Top Shelf Fiction for Middle School Readers. Her novel Racing California, set at the AMGEN Tour of California professional bicycle race, was named a Society of School Librarians International 2012 Honor Book. Her short story collection Where Words Leave Off Music Begins won the 2003 Outstanding Thesis Award for the College of Arts and Humanities at Fresno State University.

Teaching career
At the age of 18, Lynch began teaching private piano. She was an adjunct music instructor at De Anza College, Cupertino, 1980–1990, and at Skyline College, San Bruno, 1981–1990. She taught music and English at College of the Sequoias, Visalia, 1997–2009.

Employed by Visalia Unified School District from 1999 to 2014, Lynch taught English and history at the middle school and high school levels. She was the director of the Tulare County Office of Education Teen Fiction Writers’ Workshop in spring, 2015.

Personal life 
Lynch lives in Visalia, California, with her husband, composer Timothy Lynch, and they have two grown children. Lynch is an avid cyclist; she has raced bicycles and cycle-toured in the U.S. and Europe, including a ride from Phoenix, AZ to Washington, D. C. She competes in running races and triathlons.

Works

Young Adult Fiction

Commie Pinko  (2017)

Wheel of Fire (2016)

My Beautiful Hippie (2013)

Racing California (2012)

Addicted to Her  (2010)

Messed Up   (2009)

Peace is a Four Letter Word   (2005)

Casey Wooster's Pet Care Service (middle grade, 1993)

Fiction

Chest Pains   (novel, 2009)

Where Words Leave off Music Begins   (stories, 2004)

Nonfiction

Elizabeth Warren: What It Takes to Run for President (2022)

Florence Price, American Composer (2022)

Clara Schuman, Pianist and Composer   (2021)

Women Music Makers   (1992)
 
American Music Makers    (1990)

References

External links
Official Website

1952 births
Living people
Writers from Sacramento, California
American women writers
California State University, Sacramento alumni
Arizona State University alumni
California State University, Fresno alumni
21st-century American women